Premna grandifolia is a small shrub in the family Lamiaceae. It is endemic to Ivory Coast.  It is threatened by habitat loss.

References

grandifolia
Endemic flora of Ivory Coast
Vulnerable flora of Africa
Taxonomy articles created by Polbot